The Bronze Wrangler is an award presented annually by the National Cowboy & Western Heritage Museum to honor the top works in Western music, film, television and literature.

The awards were first presented in 1961. The Wrangler is a bronze sculpture of a cowboy on horseback, and is designed by artist John Free.

The awards program also recognizes inductees into the prestigious Hall of Great Westerners and the Hall of Great Western Performers as well as the recipient of the Chester A. Reynolds Memorial Award, named in honor of the Museum's founder.

Award categories

Film and television
Theatrical Motion Picture

Outstanding Docudrama

Television Feature Film

Factual Narrative

Factual Television Program (awarded from 1961 until 1989)

Fictional Television Drama

Western Documentary

Literary
Art Books

Folklore Books

Juvenile Books

Magazine Article

News Featurette

Nonfiction Book

Outstanding Photography Book

Poetry Book

Short Stories

Western Novel

Music

Outstanding New Artist

New Horizons

Music

Outstanding Original Western Composition

Outstanding Traditional Western Album
{| class="sortable wikitable" width="85%" cellpadding="5" style="margin: 1em auto 1em auto"
|-
! width="7%" scope="col"|Year
! width="28%" scope="col"|Creator(s)
! width="35%" scope="col"|Work
! width="26%" scope="col"|Publisher or publication
! width="4%" scope="col" class="unsortable"|Ref.
|-
| 1992 || Don Edwards (recording artist) || Chant of the Wanderer ||  || 
|-
| 1993 || Buck Ramsey (recording artist), Lanny Fiel, Joe Stephenson (producer), Buck Ramsey (producer) || Rolling Uphill from Texas ||
|-
| 1994 || John McEwen (composer) || The Wild West || Mogull Entertainment || 
|-
| 1995 || Buck Ramsey (composer, recording artist), Lanny Fiel (producer), Buck Ramsey (producer) || My House It Was In Texas || || 
|-
| 1996 || Riders In The Sky (recording artists), Joey Miskulin (producer) || Always Drink Upstream From The Herd ||  || 
|-
| 1997 || Don Edwards (recording artist), Jim Rooney (producer) || West Of Yesterday || Warner Western Production Company || 
|-
| 1998 || Robert Wagoner (recording artist) || The Wonder Of It All ||  || 
|-
| 1999 || David Wilkie (composer, recording artist) || Cowboy Ceilidh || Red House Records ||
|-
| 2000 || Red Steagall (composer, recording artist), Steve Gibson (producer) || Love of the West || Warner Brothers ||
|-
| 2001 || Don Edwards (recording artist), Waddie Mitchell (recording artist), Fort Worth Symphony Orchestra (recording artist), Rich O'Brien (producer), Kathleen Fox Collins (producer) || A Prairie Portrait || Western Jubilee Recording Company ||
|-
| 2002 || Don Edwards (recording artist), Rich O'Brien (producer) || Kin To The Wind/Memories of Marty Robbins || Western Jubilee Recording Company ||
|-
| 2003 || Red Steagall (recording artist), Rich O'Brien (producer) || Wagon Tracks || Western Jubilee Recording Company || 
|-
| 2004 || Buck Ramsey (recording artist, posthumanous), Charlie Seemann || Buck Ramsey: Hittin' The Trail || Smithsonian Folkways RecordingsWestern Folklife Center ||
|-
| 2005 || Les Gilliam (recording artist), Jim Farrell (producer) || It's Time To Sing A Song || Prairie Rose Records ||
|-
| 2006 || Sons of the San Joaquin (recording artist), Rich O'Brien (producer) || Way Out Yonder || Western Jubilee Recording Company ||
|-
| 2007 || Don Edwards (recording artist) || Moonlight and Skies || Western Jubilee Recording Company ||
|-
| 2008 || R.W. Hampton (recording artist), Rich O'Brien (producer), Edna Mae Holden (executive producer) || Oklahoma...Where the West Remains || ||
|-
| 2009 || Juni Fisher (composer, recording artist), Rich O'Brien (producer) || Gone for Colorado || || 
|-
| 2010 || Andy Wilkinson (recording artist), Andy Hedges (recording artist), Lloyd Maines (producer) || Welcome to the Tribe ||  || 
|-
| 2011 || Gillette Brothers (recording artist), Craig Swancey (producer) || Gillette Brothers Cowboys, Mistrels and Medicine Shows || || 
|-
| 2012 || Dan Roberts (recording artist), Roberts Allsup (producer), Tommy Allsup (producer) || Dan Roberts: The Best Of (Vol. 1) ||
|-
| 2013 || Bill Barwick (recording artist), Jim Ratts (producer) || The Usual Suspects ||  || 
|-
| 2014 || Don Edwards (recording artist) || Just Me And My Guitar || || 
|-
| 2015 || Randy Huston (recording artist), Hannah Huston (recording artist), Randy Huston (producer) || Cowboys and Girls || ||
|-
| 2016 || Waddie Mitchell & Pipp Gillette (recording artists) || Singing Songs by Waddie & Pipp || ||
|-
| 2017 || Doug Figgs, Jim Jones and Mariam (recording artists) || The Cowboy Way ||  || 
|-
| 2018 || Maye Kaye || Take Me Back to Texas'' || Don't Fence Me In Records || 
|}

Special categoriesHall of Great Western PerformersTrustees AwardOther special awardsSpecial Award: John B. Stetson Company for The Hat That Wore the West-Death Valley Days (1963)Special Award: Yakima Canutt for more than 50 years of outstanding contributions to Motion Pictures (1971)Special Award: Craig Fisher for the documentary film Survival on the Prairie (1971)Special Merit Award: Union Pacific and The Westerner in recognition of great western motion pictures made prior to 1960 (1975)Special Award: Seuil Audiovisual (producer) for Frontier Heritage; Claude Fleouter (writer-director); Denys Limon (writer); (1978)Special Award: Harold Warp, creator of pioneer village in Minden, Nebraska (1978)Special Award: Paul Aaron, host of Cowboy Joe's Radio Ranch and Prairie Echoes (1978)Special Award: Ed Rutherford, collector of Western artifacts (1980)Special Award: James A. Michener (author) (1980)John Ford Award: Sam Peckinpah (1980)Special Award: Alfred A. Knopf, publisher (1981)Special Award: John Mantley, television producer (1981)Special Award: Buck Taylor, actor (1981)Special Award: Elsa Spear Byron, author/photographer (1982)Special Award: Johnny Grant, entertainer (1982)Entertainment Arts Gold Medal: Burl Ives (1984)Special Award: Bill Kelly (producer) and Allison Brown (producer) for "Joe Wietsky: Cowboy" (1987)Special Award: Geoffrey Bell (producer) for "The Movies Go West" (1987)Special Award for Outstanding Achievement in a New Format: Kieth Merrill (director, producer) for "Alamo: The Price of Freedom" (IMAX Format) (1989)Special Award for Significant Scholarly Research: Merrill J. Mattes (editor) and University of Illinois Press (publisher) for Platte River Road Narratives (1989)Special Music Award: Arlene Markinson (producer) for "Santa Fe Spirit" (1990)Special Television Feature Award: E.W. Swackhammer (director), Chuck Sellier (producer) Alex McArthur (actor) for "Desperado" (1990)Lifetime Contribution to Western Art Award: Robert Lougheed, posthumanous award accepted by his widow Cordy Lougheed (1990)Special Award for Historical Excellence: Richard Farnsworth (narrator), Gwendolyn Clancy (producer) and the University of Nevada, Reno (producer) for "The Man They Call Will James" (1991)Special Award for the Preservation of Authentic Western Music: Michael Martin Murphey (composer, producer) for "Cowboy Logic" (1991)Directors' Award for Excellence in a Theatrical Presentation: Tommy Tune (director, choreographer), Cy Coleman (composer), Betty Comden (lyrics), Adolph Green (lyrics), Keith Carradine (actor), Pierre Cossette (producer), Martin Richards (producer), Sam Crothers (producer), James M. Nederlander (producer), Stewart Lane (producer) and Max Weitzenhoffer (producer) for "The Will Rogers Follies" (1992)Directors' Award for Excellence in a Television Presentation: Marino Amoruso (director, screenplay, producer), Ben Johnson (actor) and Harry Carey Jr. (actor) for "Legends of the American West" (1992)Directors' Award for Outstanding Study of Western Material Culture: R.L. Wilson (author) and Random House (publisher) for "The Peacemakers: Arms and Adventures in the American West" (1993)Directors' Award for Outstanding Contributions to Western Music: "Sons of the Pioneers" (1995)Outstanding Achievement in Art: Wilson Hurley following formal dedication of his five monumental "Windows to the West" triptychs (1996)Special Award: TNN in recognition of their leadership for providing the Hall's first national television special "A Cowboy Jubilee: Celebrating the National Cowboy Hall of Fame" in April 1995 (1996)Special Award for Innovation in Western Music: Michael Martin Murphey (recording artist) and Jim Ed Norman (producer) for "Sagebrush Symphony" (1996)Directors' Award For Special Literary Achievement: Peter H. Hassrick (author), Melissa J. Webster (author) and the Buffalo Bill Historical Center for "Frederic Remington: A Catalogue Raisonne of Paintings, Watercolors and Drawings" (1997)Directors' Award For Special Recognition: Frank "Pistol Pete" Eaton (1997)Directors Award for Excellence in Original Western Television Production: TNT (1997)Special Directors' Award: R.L. Wilson (author), Greg Martin (author) and Random House (publisher) (1999)Director's Award For Outstanding News Magazine Feature: Victor Neufeld (executive director), Rob Wallace (producer) and Hugh Downs (reporter) for ABC News 20/20: "Wild Horses" (1999)Special Directors Award For Special Recognition: Robert L. Klemme for marking the location of the Chisholm Trail, where it was located between the years of 1871-1874, across the state of Oklahoma (1999)Directors' Award for Television Feature Film: Uli Edel (director), Gordon Dawson (screenplay), Sam Shepard (actor), Randy Quaid (actor), Eric Roberts (actor), Brad Rowe (actor), David Rosemont (executive producer) and Daniel Schneider (producer) for "Purgatory" (TNT) Directors Award for Excellence in Dramatic Presentation and Original Music Composition: R.W. Hampton (composer), Lisa Hampton (executive producer), Rich O'Brien (producer) for "The Last Cowboy – His Journey" Directors' Award: Bob Brown, leather maker and costume designer to the Hollywood stars of early western films (2001)Special Directors' Award: Arthur Allan Seidelman (director), Jacqueline Feather (screenplay), David Seidler (screenplay), Richard Crenna (actor), David Carradine (actor), Randall C. Badger (executive producer), Dan Paulson (executive producer), Robert Halmi Jr. (executive producer), Bob Chmiel (executive producer) for By Dawn's Early Light (2001)Board of Directors' Lifetime Achievement Award: A.C. Lyles, producer for Paramount Pictures (2006)Board of Directors' Lifetime Achievement Award: Dean Smith, Hollywood stuntman, actor and gold medalist in the 1952 Olympics (2007)

ReferencesGeneralhttps://nationalcowboymuseum.org/western-heritage-award-winners/Specific'''

External links
 Official Website
 Western Heritage Awards at the Internet Movie Database

American film awards
American television awards
American literary awards
Awards established in 1961